Aloïse is a 1975 French drama film directed by Liliane de Kermadec. It was entered into the 1975 Cannes Film Festival.

Plot
The unsuccessful Swiss artist Aloïse Corbaz finds work at the court of the German emperor and gets infatuated. Showing frank symptoms of insanity she is hospitalised.

Cast
 Isabelle Huppert - Aloïse jeune / Aloïse as a child
 Delphine Seyrig - Aloïse adulte / Aloïse as an adult
 Marc Eyraud - Le père d'Aloïse / Aloïse's father
 Michael Lonsdale - Le médecin directeur / The second doctor
 Valérie Schoeller - Élise jeune / Élise as a child
 Monique Lejeune - Élise adulte / Élise as an adult
 Julien Guiomar - Le directeur de théâtre
 Roger Blin - Le professeur de chant / The singing teacher
 Jacques Debary - the old director
  - the teacher
 Jacques Weber -the engineer
 Nita Klein - the head nurse
 Hans Verner - the chaplain
 Alice Reichen - 'la microphonée'
 François Chatelet - the priest
 Fernand Guiot - the priest in the asylum

See also
 Isabelle Huppert on screen and stage

References

External links

1975 films
1970s French-language films
1975 drama films
Films directed by Liliane de Kermadec
French drama films
1970s French films